The 1864 Missouri gubernatorial election was held on November 8, 1864 and resulted in a victory for the Union Republican nominee, Thomas Clement Fletcher, over Democratic nominee former Congressman (and former Lt. Gov.) Thomas Lawson Price.

Results

References

Missouri
1864
Gubernatorial
November 1864 events